Vincent Reed (born 21 March 1940)  was an English cricketer. He was a right-handed batsman and right-arm medium-pace bowler who played for Cambridgeshire. He was born in Yelling.

Reed, who played club cricket with Papworth, and who represented Huntingdonshire between 1966 and 1980, and for Cambridgeshire in the Minor Counties Championship between 1973 and 1975, made a single List A appearance for Cambridgeshire in the 1975 Gillette Cup. He scored 8 runs and took figures of 0-26 from 12 overs of bowling.

Between 2001 and 2007, Reed played in the Over-50s County Championship for Huntingdonshire.

Reed's brother Roland, and cousins Ian, Lyndon, Trevor, Phil and Granny, played cricket for Cambridgeshire and Huntingdonshire.

External links
Vincent Reed at Cricket Archive 

1940 births
Living people
English cricketers
Cambridgeshire cricketers
People from Yelling